Traum Schallplatten is a Cologne-based which started as a  minimal techno record label run by  Jacqueline Reinhold (née Klein) and Riley Reinhold (Triple R). but had developed into a melodic techno label.  Its sub-labels are Trapez, Trapez Ltd, My Best Friend (MBF), My Best Friend Ltd, Paintwork and Zaubernuss.

Notable artists
 Dominik Eulberg
 Extrawelt
 Ikaro Grati
 Kaiserdisco
 Max Cooper
 Minilogue
 Microtrauma
 Mononoid
 Nick Dow
 Nathan Fake
 Thomas Brinkmann
 Ryan Davis

Selected Releases

Albums
Dominik Eulberg Flora & Fauna (TRAUM CD16, 2004)
Dominik Eulberg Heimische Gefilde (TRAUM CD19, 2007)
Dominik Eulberg Diorama (TRAUM CD24, 2011)

Compilations
Elektronische Musik Aus Buenos Aires (TRAUM CD01, 1999)
Thomas Brinkmann Tour De Traum (TRAUM CD 15, 2004) (DJ-Mix)
Tour De Traum series is running non stop and is reaching its 20ths release December 2020
100 (TRAUM CD20, 2008)
Elektronische Musik - Interkontinental Series (1-5) (2001–2006)

12"/EP
Gustavo Lamas Celeste (TRAUM V01, 1999)
Nathan Fake Dinamo (TRAUM V56, 2005)
Minilogue  Certain Things EP (TRAUM V64, 2005)
Dominik Eulberg & Gabriel Ananda Harzer Roller (TRAUM V70, 2006)
Extrawelt Doch Doch (TRAUM V75, 2006)
Extrawelt Mosaik EP (TRAUM V125, 2010)

See also
 List of record labels
 List of electronic music record labels

References

External links
 Official site
 

German record labels
Electronic music record labels
Techno record labels